Eric Carpenter (born July 17, 1986) is an American soccer player, currently without a club.

Career

Youth and Amateur
Carpenter attended Northridge High School and played college soccer at Bethel College, where he was named MCC All-Conference in 2007 and 2008, was an All-Region selection in 2008, and was the Bethel College Offensive Player of the Year as a senior.

Professional
Carpenter joined the USL First Division franchise Cleveland City Stars on April 15, 2009 after giving impressive performances during pre-tryouts, when he scored the game-winning goal in a preseason exhibition match against the University of Dayton. He made his professional debut on April 25, 2009, in Cleveland's game against Austin Aztex.

References

External links
 Cleveland City Stars bio

1987 births
Living people
People from Goshen, Indiana
Soccer players from Indiana
American soccer players
Cleveland City Stars players
USL First Division players
Association football midfielders